The Ranch is a census-designated place in La Garde Township, Mahnomen County, Minnesota, United States. Its population was 9 as of the 2010 census.

Demographics

References

Census-designated places in Mahnomen County, Minnesota
Census-designated places in Minnesota